Nolan Gottlieb (born 1982) is a former NCAA Division II basketballer and current professional substitute teacher in Dublin, Georgia. He suffers from the genetic condition cystic fibrosis.

Playing career

A member of Anderson's junior varsity teams, Gottlieb was promoted to the varsity team in 2004-05 due to his strong work ethic and professional attitude. In a January 2005 interview Gottlieb spoke of the determination which was the basis of his ongoing success despite the adversity presented by cystic fibrosis. "I’ve got no choice, I can get up off my rear and go out and work or be at home in bed dying at age 45. It’s either live or die. With the goals, I’ve set for myself, there’s no way I can just sit around. I’ve got to do what I’ve got to do", he said, hoping his experience would encourage and inspire fellow sufferers, "I wish there was a way to get my story out to other CF patients, I tell the younger kids with CF to stay as active as possible. That’s been the biggest thing for me."

Coaching career

Following the completion of his playing career and graduation with a degree in Kinesiology in 2005-06, Gottlieb joined the men's basketball coaching staff at Anderson University. Head Coach Jason Taylor endorsed the decision stating, "I'm pleased that he wanted to stay here at Anderson and be a part of our staff. He is a good young coach with a bright future in this business.". Nolan later went on to coach the NewSpring 17U boys in the Anderson church league, where the team finished with a record of 4-6 on the year.

Family

His father Stuart Gottlieb played four years as an offensive tackle with the Dallas Cowboys in the NFL.

References

1982 births
Living people
People from Dublin, Georgia